Križovany nad Dudváhom is a village and municipality of Trnava District in the Trnava region of Slovakia.

Rotunda
The old rotunda is one of the most interesting things to see in the village. It was built in the 11th century and has an interesting combination of Gothic and Romanesque elements. The patrotinium was the Saint Cross. In 1246 had been built a chapel to the rotunda and in 1780 had been constructed a new baroque church, which had been, however, demolished in 1937 so that a church with higher believers capacity will be built. But State Institute for the protection of historical sightseeings insisted on the protection of the rotunda and this had been succeeded. In 1938 the new church had been built, the old rotunda was preserved and the murals were restored between 1967 and 1970. 
Rotunda as well as the church are the possessions of the local Roman Catholic church. Inside the building are performed regular worship services.

Notable persons
Igor Bališ, football player, played for Slovak representation, former player of FC Spartak Trnava and West Bromwich Albion F.C.
Gejza Dusík, slovak composer

References
 
Stibrányi J. (1995): Krizovany nad Dudvahom. Rotunda Sv. Kriza. (The Rotunda of Krizovany nad Dudvahom). Komárno. .
Mencl, V. (1937): Stredoveka architektúra na Slovensku. (The Architecture of the Medieval Slovakia.) Presov.

External links
 http://en.e-obce.sk/obec/krizovanynaddudvahom/krizovany-nad-dudvahom.html
 Official page
 Profile of rotunda

Villages and municipalities in Trnava District